Novemail–Histor–Laser Computer was a French professional cycling team that existed in 1993 and 1994. The team participated in the 1993 and 1994 editions of the Tour de France.

1994 Team roster

Major wins
Sources:

1993
 Vuelta a Andalucía
Stage 2, Wilfried Nelissen
Stage 3, Jo Planckaert
  Overall Tour Méditerranéen Cycliste Professionnel, Charly Mottet
Stage 3, Charly Mottet
 Omloop Het Volk, Wilfried Nelissen
 Memorial Samyn, Wilfried Nelissen
 Clásica de Almería, Viatcheslav Ekimov
 Vuelta a Murcia
Stage 2, Viatcheslav Ekimov
Stage 4, Marcel Wüst
 Grand Prix de Denain, Marcel Wüst
 Tour de Vendée, Dimitri Zhdanov
 Stage 2 4 Jours de Dunkerque, Viatcheslav Ekimov
 Stage 5 Vuelta Asturias, Viatcheslav Ekimov
 Classique des Alpes, Eddy Bouwmans
 A Travers le Morbihan, Marcel Wüst
 Stage 4 Critérium du Dauphiné Libéré, Eddy Bouwmans
 Stage 5 Tour de Suisse, Viatcheslav Ekimov
 Stage 2 Tour de France, Wilfried Nelissen
 Stages 1, 2 & 4 Ronde van Nederland, Wilfried Nelissen
  Overall Tour du Limousin, Charly Mottet
Stage 4b, Charly Mottet
 Stage 2 Vuelta a Burgos, Marcel Wüst
 Stage 1 Volta a Catalunya, Marcel Wüst
 Stage 6 Tour de l'Avenir, Cédric Vasseur
 Paris–Bourges, Bruno Cornillet
 Stages 3 & 7b Herald Sun Tour, Marcel Wüst
1994
 Étoile de Bessèges
Stages 1 & 3, Wilfried Nelissen
Stage 4, Nico Verhoeven
 Stage 3 La Méditerranéenne, Wilfried Nelissen
 Omloop Het Volk, Wilfried Nelissen
 Stage 7 Paris–Nice, Charly Mottet
 Stage 1 Critérium International, Eddy Bouwmans
 Stages 1 & 2 Four Days of Dunkirk, Wilfried Nelissen
 Binche–Chimay–Binche, Wilfried Nelissen
 Stage 10 Olympia's Tour, Raymond Thebes
 Critérium du Dauphiné Libéré
Stage 1, Marcel Wüst
Stage 6, Ronan Pensec
 Stage 4 Vuelta a Asturias, Wilfried Nelissen
  National Road Race Championship, Wilfried Nelissen
 Stage 3 Tour du Limousin, Eddy Bouwmans
 Grand Prix d'Isbergues, Wilfried Nelissen
 Stage 1 Herald Sun Tour, Marcel Wüst

Supplementary statistics
Source:

References

External links

Cycling teams based in France
Defunct cycling teams based in France
1993 establishments in France
1994 disestablishments in France
Cycling teams established in 1993
Cycling teams disestablished in 1994